The women's 200 metre individual medley competition of the swimming events at the 1995 Pan American Games took place between March 12–17 at the Complejo Natatorio. The last Pan American Games champion was Lisa Summers of US.

This race consisted of four lengths of the pool, one each in backstroke, breaststroke, butterfly and freestyle swimming.

Results
All times are in minutes and seconds.

Heats

Final 
The final was held between March 12–17.

References

Swimming at the 1995 Pan American Games
1995 in women's swimming